Survation is a polling and market research agency based in London, England. Survation have been conducting research surveys since 2010. Surveys are conducted via telephone, online panel and face to face as well as omnibus research for a broad range of clients including television, newspapers, charities, lobby groups, trade unions, law firms and political parties. Damian Lyons Lowe is the company founder and Chief Executive.

Overview
Survation was incorporated on 2 February 2010 as a private limited company.

The company is a member of the British Polling Council and Market Research Society. The company Chief Executive, Damian Lyons Lowe is the company's representative and member on the British Polling Council.

Survation were reported to be the most active and accurate opinion polling company (online and telephone) during the Scottish Independence Referendum campaign in which the final result was 55% for “No”. Survation’s eve of polling day telephone poll was very narrowly more accurate than Ipsos Mori, who also used a telephone-based methodology. The company also claimed that the Survation final poll before the 2015 general election was exceptionally accurate, unlike most others, but the result was suppressed by the CEO through fear of the poll being an outlier.

2016 EU Referendum
In contrast to polling published on or conducted during the day of the EU Referendum by Populus, YouGov, and Ipsos Mori that predicted the UK would vote to remain in EU, Survation conducted a private exit poll which correctly predicted Leave, despite academics deciding an exit poll for broadcast would not be feasible and an expensive and difficult proposition.

2017 UK election
Survation, alone amongst opinion pollsters, correctly predicted a hung parliament. Their Chief Executive, Damian Lyons Lowe, appeared on a BBC program where the poll was mocked and described as an "outlier". After the election, he was invited back on the BBC to talk again about his prediction.

Methodology
Survation opinion polling is achieved through telephone, online and face to face surveys. Nationally, data is weighted to represent the wider population of the United Kingdom in terms of gender, age, socio-economic group, religion, how they have previously voted, and how likely a person says they are to vote in the next general election. Respondents who are either undecided or refuse to state how they would vote are excluded from the final results, unless they have provided details of how they have voted in the past, in which case, that information is used to adjust the results accordingly.

See also
Opinion polling for the next United Kingdom general election
2010 United Kingdom general election
Marketing research

References

Market research companies of the United Kingdom
British companies established in 2007
2007 establishments in the United Kingdom
Companies based in the London Borough of Tower Hamlets
Polling organisations in the United Kingdom